DAV Public School, Sector IV is a school in Bokaro Steel City, Jharkhand, India, affiliated by CBSE and situated in the heart of city having a strength of 4500+ students. It is based on the ideals of the religious and social reformer, Swami Dayanand Saraswati.  It is managed by DAV College Managing Committee (DAV-CMC). It was established in 1973. Mr Arun Kumar Jha is its principal at present. The school provides facility for cricket, football, volleyball, basketball, handball, athletics, gymnastics, lawn tennis and has an indoor stadium within its campus for badminton and table tennis. Bollywood actor Imran Zahid, IAS Awkash Kumar, IRS Joint Commissioner Amaresh Kumar, cricketer Rahul Mishra and CA Pranav Nikunj are some of its notable alumni.

Courses
Science  PCM, PCB
Commerce  Accountancy, Business Studies, Economics
Arts  Geography, Political Science, Economics
Information Technology, Computer Science (083) with Python, Informatics Practices (065) & Artificial Intelligence.

Language offered
English
Hindi
Sanskrit (class 5 to 10)

Infrastructural facilities
Hostel (only for boys) 
IT Infrastructure: 3 computer labs
Library: Consists of 1 library
Pure drinking Water facility
Transport: Consists of 20+ buses
Music Rooms
Dance Rooms
Toilet facilities: Consists of 10+ clean and hygienic toilets
Auditoriums: Consists of 1 auditorium
Science Labs
CCTV cameras across the campus
Medical Rooms
Gym: Consists of 1 gym with latest equipments
World class infrastructure for Badminton and Table Tennis
Lawn Tennis court
Synthetic court for Basketball
Cricket and Football ground
Basic facility for gymnastics

Alumni 
 Awkash Kumar  IAS officer
 Amaresh Kumar  IRS, Deputy Commissioner (Tirupati)
 Imran Zahid  Bollywood actor 
 Rahul Mishra  Ranji Cricketer
Shubham Kumar Jha - Founder Egee India Software Solutions
Pranav Nikunj - Chartered Accountant

See also
Education in India
CBSE

References

External links
Official website of DAV, Bokaro, Sector 4

Private schools in Jharkhand
Schools affiliated with the Arya Samaj
Education in Bokaro Steel City